Hospices of Hope is a non-profit organisation which aims to provide palliative care services to adults and children with terminal and life-limiting illnesses in Southeastern Europe. The main areas of delivery are Romania, Serbia, and Moldova. Hospices of Hope also provides training and education programmes in countries outside of the core provision.

The organisation is headquartered in Otford, Kent, in the United Kingdom.

History 
After visiting Romania before and after the Revolution of 1989, founder, Graham Perolls OBE, CMG, learned of the nonexistence of palliative care in the country. Having previously established the Ellenor Foundation in 1985 which built a hospice in Dartford, Kent, the organisation started fundraising for palliative care provisions in Romania. The Ellenor Foundation was behind operations in Romania until 2000 when that part took on its independent identity, Hospices of Hope. Most fundraising activities contributed to training programmes which was provided by UK nurses until 1997 when an education centre was opened and run in large part by Romanian nurses trained under previous programmes run by the charity. In 2002, its first in-patient hospice was built in Brasov.

Scope of Work

Romania

HOSPICE Casa Sperantei, Brasov 
Founded in 1992, Casa Sperantei provides care for people living with terminal illnesses and children with a range of life-limiting illnesses with a team also serving the capital, Bucharest. There also exists an education programme to aid the development of palliative care nationally and in neighbouring Balkan countries. The hospice works to develop a national strategy for palliative care with the Ministry of Health.

Hospice Casa Sperantei Rural Teams 
These teams operate in the Fagara and Zarnesti regions and provide palliative care in the form of home visits.

HOSPICE Casa Sperantei "Princess Diana" Education Centre, Brasov 
Established in 1997, this centre is accredited by Ministry of Public Health as the National Study and Resource Centre for Palliative Care. In 2000, it became the Regional Palliative Care Training Centre for South-Eastern Europe.

Hospice Casa Sperantei, Bucharest 
HOSPICE Casa Sperantei, Bucharest, was established in 2005. It delivered care via medical teams which provided home and hospital visits. Bucharest’s first out-patient clinic opened in 2007. In 2014, a new hospice was built in the Romanian capital.

Serbia 
Hospices of Hope supports Belhospice which was established in 2004 by Dr. Natasa Milicevic. In 2006 the Prue Dufour medical educational centre was established.

Moldova 
Hospices of Hope Moldova supports existing palliative care organisations in the regions of Orhei, Soroca, and Ocnita. Medical supplies such as stoma bags and prosthetic breasts are also sent to Moldova from UK donations.

References 

Hospices